California native plants are plants that existed in California prior to the arrival of European explorers and colonists in the late 18th century. California includes parts of at least three phytochoria. The largest is the California Floristic Province, a geographical area that covers most of California, portions of neighboring Oregon, Nevada, and Baja California, and is regarded as a "world hotspot" of biodiversity.

Introduction
In 1993, The Jepson Manual estimated that California was home to 4,693 native species and 1,169 native subspecies or varieties, including 1,416 endemic species. A 2001 study by the California Native Plant Society estimated 6,300 native plants. These estimates continue to change over time.

Of California's total plant population, 2,153 species, subspecies, and varieties are endemic and native to California alone, according to the 1993 Jepson Manual study. This botanical diversity stems not only from the size of the state, but also its diverse topographies, climates, and soils (e.g. serpentine outcrops). Numerous plant groupings exist in California, and botanists work to structure them into identifiable ecoregions, plant communities, vegetation types, and habitats, and taxonomies.

California native plants include some that have widespread horticultural use. Sometimes the appreciation began outside of California—lupines, California fuchsias, and California poppies were first cultivated in British and European gardens for over a century.

Selected trees

Coniferous trees

Sequoias and redwoods

Coast redwood (Sequoia sempervirens) - in the fog-shrouded coast ranges.
Giant sequoia (Sequoiadendron giganteum) - in the Sierra Nevada Mountains.

Pine trees

Bishop pine (Pinus muricata): coastal species grown in gardens
Coulter pine (Pinus coulteri) 
Gray pine, ghost pine, or digger pine (Pinus sabiniana)
Knobcone pine (Pinus attenuata) 
Ponderosa pine (Pinus ponderosa): well known in mountains 
Lodgepole pine (Pinus contorta): used for early construction of buildings and other structures. 
Monterey pine (Pinus radiata): naturally limited endemic range; widely planted horticulturally around the world 
Limber pine (Pinus flexilis)
Jeffrey pine (Pinus jeffreyi) 
Parry pinyon (Pinus quadrifolia)
Shore pine (Pinus contorta)
Sugar pine (Pinus lambertiana) 
Torrey pine (Pinus torreyana) 
Western white pine (Pinus monticola)
Single-leaf pinyon pine (Pinus monophylla) 
Great Basin bristlecone pine (Pinus longaeva): the Methuselah, a 4,700-year-old specimen
Foxtail pine (Pinus balfouriana): endemic to California; 2,000-year-old specimens

Western Cypress

Arizona cypress (Cupressus arizonica)
Baker cypress (Cupressus bakeri)
Cuyamaca cypress (Cupressus stephensonii)
Gowen cypress (Cupressus goveniana)
McNab's cypress (Cupressus macnabiana)
Monterey cypress (Cupressus macrocarpa)
Paiute cypress (Cupressus nevadensis)
Pygmy cypress (Cupressus pigmaea)
Santa Cruz cypress (Cupressus abramsiana)
Sargent's cypress (Cupressus sargentii)
Tecate cypress (Cupressus forbesii)

Other conifers
Santa Lucia fir (Abies bracteata) and seven other native Abies species.
Douglas fir (Pseudotsuga menziesii) 
Bigcone Douglas-fir (Pseudotsuga macrocarpa) - Central Coast and Santa Susana Mountains. 
California nutmeg (Torreya californica)
Incense cedar (Calocedrus decurrens) 
Port Orford cedar-Lawson cypress (Chamaecyparis lawsoniana)
White fir (Abies concolor) - at high elevations
Mountain hemlock (Tsuga mertensiana)
Red fir (Abies magnifica)
Pacific yew (Taxus brevifolia)
Western juniper (Juniperus occidentalis)

Oak trees

California is home to many deciduous and evergreen oaks, often occurring in oak woodlands:
Valley oak (Quercus lobata) - the largest of the oaks.
Leather oak (Quercus durata) - an evergreen shrub endemic to serpentine chaparral.
Blue oak (Quercus douglasii) - in the Central Valley foothills and Coast Ranges.
California black oak (Quercus kelloggii) - in the higher hills and mountains.
Canyon live oak (Quercus chrysolepis) - found mainly in northern mountainous regions.
Interior live oak (Quercus wislizeni) in the Central Valley region.
Island oak (Quercus tomentella) - endemic with distinctive large evergreen leaves.
Engelmann oak (Quercus engelmanni) - an endangered species with a cool blue-gray cast to the foliage.
Coast live oak (Quercus agrifolia) is found in the Coast Ranges, Transverse Ranges, Peninsular Ranges, and along the coast's hills and adjacent interior valleys, and many other habitats and gardens.

Riparian trees

In riparian areas (streamside and moist habitats) some of the trees include:
California sycamore (Platanus racemosa)
White alder (Alnus rhombifolia)
Quaking aspen (Populus tremuloides)
Fremont cottonwood (Populus fremontii)
Black cottonwood (Populus trichocarpa)
Arroyo willow (Salix lasiolepis)

Other trees and tree-like shrubs
Tanoak (Notholithocarpus densiflorus)
California bay laurel (Umbellularia californica)
Pacific madrone (Arbutus menziesii)
Toyon (Heteromeles arbutifolia)
Bigleaf maple (Acer macrophyllum)
Western blue elderberry (Sambucus mexicana) is found throughout the state, an important host for birds, butterflies, pollinators, and beneficial insects (integrated pest management)
California buckeye (Aesculus californica)
Western redbud (Cercis occidentalis)
California black walnut (Juglans californica)
California hazelnut (Corylus cornuta)

Selected shrubs

Chamise (Adenostoma fasciculatum)
Serviceberry (Amelanchier alnifolia)
Manzanita (Arctostaphylos spp.)
California sagebrush (Artemisia californica)
Coyote brush (Baccharis pilularis)
Calliandra (Calliandra spp.)
California lilacs (Ceanothus spp.)
Desert willow (Chilopsis linearis)
Flannelbush (Fremontodendron spp.)
Hollyleaf cherry (Prunus ilicifolia)
Spicebush (Calycanthus occidentalis)
Bush anemone (Carpenteria californica)
Bladderpod (Peritoma arborea)
Creosote bush (Larrea tridentata)
Lupines (Lupinus spp.)
Snowberry (Symphoricarpos mollis & spp.)
Huckleberry (Vaccinium ovatum & spp.)
Coffeeberry (Frangula californica)
Lemonade berry (Rhus integrifolia)
Sugarbush (Rhus ovata)
Gooseberries and currants (Ribes spp.)
Sages (Salvia spp.)

Selected desert plants

California fan palm (Washingtonia filifera)
Joshua tree (Yucca brevifolia)
Jojoba (Simmondsia chinensis)
California juniper (Juniperus californica)
Blue palo verde (Parkinsonia florida)
Yellow foothill palo verde (Parkinsonia microphylla)
Single-leaf pinyon (Pinus monophylla)
Fremont cottonwood (Populus fremontii)
Ocotillo (Fouquieria splendens)
Creosote bush (Larrea tridentata)
Indian mallow (Abutilon palmeri)
Brittlebush (Encelia farinosa)
Desert agave (Agave deserti)
California barrel cactus (Ferocactus cylindraceus)
Banana yucca (Yucca baccata)
Mojave yucca (Yucca schidigera)
Rush milkweed (Asclepias subulata)
Purple desert sand-verbena (Abronia villosa)
Sacred datura (Datura wrightii)

Selected perennials

Sunny habitats
California poppy (Eschscholzia californica) are found in drier places. California poppies are also an annual in many places.
Douglas iris (Iris douglasiana) and 'Pacific Coast' hybrids
Monkeyflower e.g.: Mimulus aurantiacus, Mimulus guttatus, Mimulus cardinalis and cultivars.
Columbine (Aquilegia spp.)
Coyote mint (Monardella spp.)
Buckwheats (Eriogonum fasciculatum), (Eriogonum giganteum), (Eriogonum umbellatum)

Shady habitats
Western wild ginger (Asarum caudatum)
Pacific bleeding heart (Dicentra formosa)
Island coral bells (Heuchera maxima)
Canyon coral bells (Heuchera hirsutissima)
× Heucherella
Threeleaf foamflower (Tiarella trifoliata)
Redwood sorrel (Oxalis oregana)

Ferns
Polypody ferns (Polypodium), e.g.: Polypodium californicum
Native sword ferns (Polystichum), e.g.: Polystichum munitum
Giant chain fern (Woodwardia fimbriata)
Goldback ferns (Pteridium spp.)
Wood ferns (Dryopteris spp.), e.g.: Dryopteris arguta
Maidenhair ferns (Adiantum spp.) e.g.: Adiantum jordanii

Selected bulbs

Ithuriel's spear (Triteleia spp.)
Meadow onion (Allium monticola)
Goldenstars (Bloomeria crocea)
Brodiaeas (Brodiaea spp.)
Blue dicks-ookow (Dipterostemon capitatus): one of the most common native bulb species throughout California; found in grassland and dry meadow habitats
Mariposa lilies (Calochortus spp.): available from reputable horticultural sources; taking from the wild is illegal and is resulting in significant declines of some species from over collecting.

Selected annuals and wildflowers

Baby blue eyes (Nemophila menziesii)
Blazing star (Mentzelia lindleyi)
California poppy (Eschscholzia californica)
Chinese houses (Collinsia heterophylla)
Elegant clarkia (Clarkia unguiculata)
Farewell to spring (Clarkia amoena)
Meadowfoam (Limnanthes douglasii)
Miner's lettuce (Claytonia perfoliata)
Tarweed (Madia elegans)
Wind poppy (Papaver heterophyllum)

Selected vines

Dutchman's pipe vine (Aristolochia spp.)
Morning glory (Calystegia spp.)
Chaparral clematis (Clematis lasiantha)
Western virgin's bower (Clematis ligusticifolia)
Calabazilla (Cucurbita foetidissima)
Wild cucumber-manroot (Marah fabacea)
Cucamonga manroot-bigroot (Marah macrocarpa)
California wild grape (Vitis californica)
Desert wild grape (Vitis girdiana)

Selected grasses

 Grasses:
Purple three-awn (Aristida purpurea)
Blue grama (Bouteloua gracilis)
California fescue (Festuca californica)
Idaho fescue (Festuca idahoensis)
Red fescue (Festuca rubra)
Junegrass (Koeleria macrantha)
Giant wildrye (Leymus condensatus)
California melic (Melica californica)
Deer grass (Muhlenbergia rigens)
Purple needlegrass (Nassella pulchra): The state grass of California
Indian ricegrass (Oryzopsis hymenoides)
Pine bluegrass (Poa secunda)

 Grasslike:
Sedges — (Carex spp.) (taller 'bunch grass' specimens and lower meadow spreaders)
Rushes — (Juncus spp.)
Western blue-eyed grass (Sisyrinchium bellum) and yellow-eyed-grass (Sisyrinchium californicum).

Selected succulents

Dudleyas
Chalk lettuce (Dudleya pulverulenta) - garden-plant
Coast dudleya (Dudleya caespitosa) - [CA endemic]
Canyon live-forever (Dudleya cymosa) - garden-plant
Fingertips (Dudleya edulis) - garden-plant
Giant chalk dudleya, Britton's dudleya (Dudleya brittonii) - garden-plant
Lanceleaf liveforever (Dudleya lanceolata) - garden-plant
Sedums
Broadleaf stonecrop (Sedum spathulifolium) - San Bruno elfin butterfly host plant.
Coast sedum (Sedum oreganum)
Feather River stonecrop (Sedum albomarginatum) - [CA endemic, Sierras]
Red Mountain stonecrop (Sedum eastwoodiae) - [CA endemic, Mendocino]
Roseflower stonecrop (Sedum laxum)
Sierra stonecrop (Sedum obtusatum)

Environmental challenges
Some California native plants are in rapid decline in their native habitat due to urban sprawl, agriculture, overgrazing, recreational impacts, pollution, and invasive non-native species (invasive exotics) colonization pressures (animals and other kingdoms of life, as well as plants).

California also has 1,023 species of non-native plants, some now problematic invasive species such as yellow starthistle, that were introduced during the Spanish colonization, the California Gold Rush, and subsequent immigrations and import trading of the 18th, 19th and 20th centuries.

See also
California Native Plant Society
Theodore Payne Foundation

References

Further reading

Books: flora
A California Flora and Supplement, Philip A. Munz and David D. Keck, UC Press

Grasses in California, Beecher Crampton, UC Press
The Jepson Manual: Higher Plants of California, James C. Hickman (Editor), UC Press
The Jepson Desert Manual: Vascular Plants of Southeastern California, Bruce Baldwin (Editor), UC Press
Oaks of California, Bruce M. Pavlik, Pamela Muick, Sharon Johnson, Cachuma Press
Plants of the San Francisco Bay Region: Mendocino to Monterey, Linda Beidleman, Eugene Kozloff, UC Press

Books: gardening/landscaping
Landscape Plants for California Gardens, Bob Perry, Land Design Publishing
California Native Plants for the Garden, Carol Bornstein, David Fross, and Bart O'Brien, Cachuma Press
California Native Trees and Shrubs, Lee W. Lenz, Rancho Santa Ana
Ceanothus, David Fross and Dieter Wilken, Timber Press
Complete Guide to Native Perennials of California, Glenn Keator, Chronicle Books
Complete Guide to Native Shrubs of California, Glenn Keator, Chronicle Books
Designing California Native Gardens: The Plant Community Approach to Artful, Ecological Gardens, Glenn Keator and Alrie Middlebrook, UC Press
Growing California Native Plants, Marjorie Schmidt, UC Press
Native Landscaping From El Paso to L.A., Sally Wasowski and Andy Wasowski, McGraw-Hill
Native Plants for California Gardens, Lee W. Lenz, Day Printing Corp.
Native Treasures: Gardening with the Plants of California, M. Nevin Smith, UC Press

External links

CNPS—California Native Plant Society website provides CalScape Database, an extensive database of California native plants searchable by region, as well as other useful resources.
CalFlora Database — extensive searchable database of California native plants.
Jepson Manual 'Flora Interchange' — extensive database of California native plants
U.C. CalPhotos: Flora homepage — searchable images database
Theodore Payne Foundation for Wildflowers and Native Plants — including horticultural information
California Native Grasslands Association — including bunchgrass species and habitats
Lady Bird Johnson Wildflower Center - Recommended Species — provides a national searchable supplier directory for landscaping, environmental consultants, seed sources and nurseries; recommended plant lists that can be filtered to include plants native to California; and plant recommendations for specific regions of California.
Audubon Society — includes a national searchable database of native plants suitable for attracting wildlife, especially birds.
USDA plants — an extensive searchable national database of numerous native and non-native plants with various filters.
EPA Ecoregion Research — provides research data on ecoregion levels III and IV of California with some useful native plant information.
National Wildlife Federation — a functional national native plant database in the beta testing phase.
Eugene Otto Weber Murman Watercolors of California Flora, 1941-1961

Native plants